The Ireland cricket team toured Canada from 31 August - 7 September 2010. They played one first-class match as part of the ICC Intercontinental Cup and two One Day Internationals (ODIs).

Intercontinental Cup Match

ODI series

1st ODI

2nd ODI

References 

2010 in Canadian cricket
2010 in cricket
Canadian cricket in the 21st century
Canada
International cricket competitions in 2010–11
Canada–Ireland relations